The 1994 New York City Marathon was the 25th running of the annual marathon race in New York City, United States, which took place on Sunday, November 6. The men's elite race was won by Mexico's Germán Silva in a time of 2:11:21 hours while the women's race was won by Kenya's Tegla Loroupe in 2:27:37. Loroupe became the first African woman to win a major global-level marathon.

A total of 29,735 runners finished the race, 22,758 men and 6977 women.

Results

Men

Women

References

Results
Results. Association of Road Racing Statisticians. Retrieved 2020-05-23.

External links
New York Road Runners website

1994
New York City
Marathon
New York City Marathon